Cardinal (also known as Harrier) is a fictional character, a supervillain appearing in American comic books published by Marvel Comics. He is African American.

Publication history
Cardinal first appeared in New Warriors #28 and was created by Fabian Nicieza and Darick Robertson.

Cardinal has appeared in the pages of New Warriors, Night Thrasher, and Thunderbolts.

Fictional character biography
Donald Joshua Clendenon is a Vietnam War veteran. While on a mission in Rhodesia, he conceives a child named Valerie Barnhardt with fellow mercenary buddy Sprocket (Amelia Barnhardt). At some point, Clendenon is outfitted with a powered suit of armor and took the name Cardinal. Cardinal first appeared as a bodyguard for arms smuggler Jeremy Swimming-Bear (aka "Sea Urchin"). The plot was foiled by the New Warriors. Broken out of prison by his allies, the Air Force, he and the team went after the New Warriors, but were defeated and sent back to prison.

Some time later, Air Force was dispatched to attack Dwayne Taylor and a group of high-powered corporate officials on a jet bringing humanitarian aid to the people of Bosnia-Herzogovina. Taylor, secretly Night Thrasher, defeated Air Force and blackmailed them into assisting in relief efforts in middle Africa.

In Africa, Air Force were moved by the humanitarian disaster and began to earnestly help transport food and other aid to the starving peoples of the region. Protocol and his Soldiers of Misfortune attempted to interfere with the rescue missions and decimated Air Force, killing two of their members. Cardinal was badly injured in the battle. With the destruction of Air Force and frustrated with his attempt to do good, Clendenon repaired the Cardinal armor and vowed to continue to work on his own as a mercenary-for-hire.

Cardinal joined the Crimson Cowl's version of the Masters of Evil. The Thunderbolts defeated the Masters of Evil and destroyed the Crimson Cowl's weather machine which threatened the whole world. Cardinal was again incarcerated in Seagate Prison.

To clear her criminal record, Cardinal's daughter Valerie becomes a member of the government Redeemers program and is given the name Meteorite along with a special fighting suit. She is murdered along with several of her teammates during a battle with the villain Graviton. Josh didn't know he had a daughter until after her death and a paternity test is done after her corpse is retrieved from space by S.H.I.E.L.D. Hawkeye and the Thunderbolts' connection to the Redeemers is what the Crimson Cowl uses to get Cardinal to rejoin her Masters of Evil. Hawkeye tracks the Masters of Evil down and convinces them that most of them were infected by a deadly biotoxin with which the Crimson Cowl sought to control them. Hawkeye makes a deal with them for the four Masters of Evil to join him, Songbird, and Plant-Man to stop the Crimson Cowl. They accept and form a new team of Thunderbolts. Cardinal takes the new name of Harrier. The team defeats Crimson Cowl and the rest of her Masters of Evil. They are able to neutralize the biotoxin.

Soon after, Citizen V contacts the team explaining that the engines of the Vanguard, the V-Battalion's airship, had created a white hole. This threatens to fuse the whole Northern Hemisphere into glass within two hours time. He explains he needs the Thunderbolts' muscle to fill the white hole with as much material as necessary. Surprisingly, the core Thunderbolts team, who had been missing on Counter-Earth, emerge from the void. The two teams close down the anomaly void and flee the V-Battalion. The Thunderbolts reorganize and Harrier voluntarily returns to prison.

Powers and abilities
Clendenon has no superhuman powers. As Cardinal he wears a suit of powered armor that gives increased strength, body armor, flight and the ability to function underwater. The suit incorporates a number of offensive weapons including energy blasters, grenade launcher and tar gun.

In other media
Cardinal appears in The Avengers: United They Stand episode "Command Decision" voiced by Peter Wildman. This version is a member of Baron Helmut Zemo's Masters of Evil.

References

External links
 Cardinal at Marvel.com
 Cardinal at Marvel Wiki

Characters created by Fabian Nicieza
Comics characters introduced in 1992
Fictional African-American people
Fictional Vietnam War veterans
Marvel Comics male supervillains
Marvel Comics military personnel
Marvel Comics supervillains
Marvel Comics superheroes